Hoyland Town F.C. was an English association football club based in Hoyland, Barnsley, South Yorkshire.

History
The club was formed in the 19th century, and entered the FA Cup on numerous occasions before folding during the First World War.

Honours
Barnsley Association League
Champions - 1902/03, 1903/04, 1908/09, 1909/10 (shared)

Records
Best FA Cup performance: 3rd Qualifying Round, 1906–07, 1910–11

References

Defunct football clubs in South Yorkshire
Hatchard League
Sheffield Association League
Barnsley Association League
Association football clubs established in the 19th century
Association football clubs disestablished in the 20th century